The Daily Mirror Silver Cup was a series of American football games, played by US Navy Servicemen in Great Britain in 1910. The Daily Mirror became the title sponsor.

1st Daily Mirror Silver Cup
The first game was on Thanksgiving Day November 23. The team from the USS Idaho won 19-0 in front of a crowd of 10,000, collecting the Daily Mirror Silver Cup from the Duke of Manchester.

2nd Daily Mirror Silver Cup
The second game was on December 3, also at Crystal palace. Organised by Rear Admiral Seaton Schroeder the final was a much more serious affair, but the Idaho team won again 5-0 in front of a crowd of 12,000. This time the Duchess of Marlborough presented the Cup.

3rd Daily Mirror Silver Cup
USS Georgia defeated USS Rhode Island 12-0 at Stonebridge Road, in front of a crowd of 4,000.

References 

Defunct American football competitions
American football in the United Kingdom
Military competitions in American football
Sports in the United States Navy
Awards by newspapers
1910 in American football
1910 in English sport
Daily Mirror